Leif Amble-Næss (May 8, 1896 – January 18, 1974) was a Norwegian actor, singer, and theater director.

Amble-Næss debuted in 1916 at Oslo's Central Theater, where he mostly appeared in comedies and operettas. At the National Theater he directed and appeared in Franz Lehár's The Merry Widow in 1938. He also directed Johann Strauss II's Die Fledermaus in 1931. From 1936 onward he lived in Stockholm, where he was associated with the Oscar Theater and the Blanche Theater, and in 1955 he became the director of the Folkan Theater, where he also acted. Later he was engaged with the Swedish National Theater. In the 1950s he appeared in some performances at Chat Noir in Oslo.

Leif Amble-Næss is considered one of the leading Norwegian leading actors in comedies and revues during the interwar period. As a singer and cabaret artist, he was a sharp satirist and clever humorist. His versatile talent meant that he also achieved success as a traditional dancer and step dancer, and he had a firm command of revue songs. Several of his revue successes were recorded for HMV in the 1930s.

Amble-Næss also appeared in some Norwegian and Swedish films, including Den store barnedåpen (1931), Op med hodet! (1933), Mot nya tider (1939), and Den gula bilen (1963).

Filmography
1931: Den store barnedåpen as the Anabaptist
1933: En stille flirt as Doktor Gerhardt, a beautician
1934: Op med hodet! as the ballet instructor
1939: Mot nya tider as Harald Bothner, Norwegian government minister
1940: Med dej i mina armar as Sardini
1941: Lärarinna på vift as a nightclub guest
1945: Rattens musketörer as the angry man on the phone (uncredited)
1954: Flottans glada gossar as the porter at the French hotel
1954: Seger i mörker as the professor in Zürich (cut footage)
1956: Skorpan as a tourist
1958: Du är mitt äventyr as a jury member at the art exhibition
1963: Den gula bilen as Curt Lorénz, the embassy councilor

References

External links

1896 births
1974 deaths
Norwegian theatre directors
20th-century Norwegian male singers
20th-century Norwegian singers
20th-century Norwegian male actors
People from Bjarkøy
Norwegian emigrants to Sweden